Bedi Bastien Buval (born 16 June 1986) is a former professional footballer who played as a striker. Born in France, he made one appearance for the Martinique national team scoring once.

Club career
Born in Domont, Val-d'Oise, Buval joined Bolton Wanderers at the age of 16 from AS Nancy, but he never broke through to the first team as a senior, being limited to reserve football and also suffering from recurring knee problems. In November 2006, he returned to his country and signed for FC Red Star Saint-Ouen in the Championnat National.

In July 2007, Buval agreed to a two-year contract with Danish Superliga club Randers FC, joining after a trial period as a replacement for Djiby Fall who had left at the end of the previous season. He struggled initially to become a first-team regular and, with Søren Berg and Marc Nygaard (both former Danish internationals) joining the team during the winter break, he received additional competition; eventually, as Berg moved to right midfielder, the Frenchman begun appearing more, and finished the campaign with seven goals in 27 games.

Buval signed with Panthrakikos F.C. in Greece on 30 July 2009. On 13 January of the following year, he moved to fellow Superleague side Panionios FC, scoring only three goals combined during the season and suffering relegation with the former.

In the 2010 summer, Buval changed clubs – and countries – again, joining Lechia Gdańsk from Poland on a one-year deal. He was released on 3 July 2011.

On 16 September 2011, after a successful trial, Buval signed for two years with C.D. Feirense in Portugal. He was awarded the Primeira Liga's SJPF Player of the Month award for the month of December, after scoring against Vitória de Setúbal (1–1 away draw) and U.D. Leiria (two goals, 2–1 home success), and finished the season as team top scorer but they were eventually relegated just one year after promoting.

On 23 July 2012, Buval joined Göztepe S.K. in Turkey on a three-year contract. On 31 January of the following year, however, he changed teams and countries once again, signing for Denmark's Vejle Boldklub Kolding until the end of the campaign.

In the following years, in quick succession, Buval represented Académica de Coimbra, F.C. Paços de Ferreira, S.C. Olhanense and Flamurtari Vlorë, agreeing to a two-and-a-half-year contract with the latter on 28 January 2015 for a reported €11,000 per month. He left on 17 October, claiming he was not being paid by the club.

In February 2016, Buval joined FC Carl Zeiss Jena in the German Regionalliga Nordost.

International career
Buval chose to represent Martinique internationally. He scored in his debut on 16 November 2014, helping to a 2–0 group stage win over Antigua and Barbuda for that year's Caribbean Cup.

Career statistics

Scores and results list Martinique's goal tally first, score column indicates score after each Buval goal.

References

External links

1986 births
Living people
People from Domont
Footballers from Val-d'Oise
French people of Martiniquais descent
French footballers
Martiniquais footballers
Association football forwards
Bolton Wanderers F.C. players
Red Star F.C. players
Danish Superliga players
Danish 1st Division players
Randers FC players
Vejle Boldklub Kolding players
Super League Greece players
Panthrakikos F.C. players
Panionios F.C. players
Ekstraklasa players
Lechia Gdańsk players
Primeira Liga players
Liga Portugal 2 players
C.D. Feirense players
Associação Académica de Coimbra – O.A.F. players
F.C. Paços de Ferreira players
S.C. Olhanense players
TFF First League players
Göztepe S.K. footballers
Kategoria Superiore players
Flamurtari Vlorë players
Regionalliga players
FC Carl Zeiss Jena players
FSV Wacker 90 Nordhausen players
Martinique international footballers
2014 Caribbean Cup players
French expatriate footballers
French expatriate sportspeople in England
Expatriate footballers in England
French expatriate sportspeople in Denmark
Expatriate men's footballers in Denmark
French expatriate sportspeople in Greece
Expatriate footballers in Greece
French expatriate sportspeople in Poland
Expatriate footballers in Poland
French expatriate sportspeople in Portugal
Expatriate footballers in Portugal
French expatriate sportspeople in Turkey
Expatriate footballers in Turkey
French expatriate sportspeople in Albania
Expatriate footballers in Albania
French expatriate sportspeople in Germany
Expatriate footballers in Germany